The 1990–91 Rutgers Scarlet Knights men's basketball represented Rutgers University in the 1990–91 NCAA Division I men's basketball season. The head coach was Bob Wenzel, then in his third season with the Scarlet Knights. The team played its home games in Louis Brown Athletic Center in Piscataway Township, New Jersey, and was a member of the Atlantic-10 Conference. The Scarlet Knights finished atop the conference's regular season standings, and would receive an at-large bid to the NCAA tournament. Rutgers fell to Arizona State, 79–76, in the opening round.

Roster

Schedule and results

|-
!colspan=9 style=| Regular season

|-
!colspan=9 style=| Atlantic-10 tournament

|-
!colspan=9 style=| NCAA tournament

Awards and honors
Keith Hughes – Atlantic 10 Player of the Year

References 

Rutgers
Rutgers Scarlet Knights men's basketball seasons
Rutgers
1990 in sports in New Jersey
1991 in sports in New Jersey